Theilera is a genus of plants in the Campanulaceae. It contains two known species, both endemic to Cape Province of South Africa.

 Theilera guthriei (L.Bolus) E.Phillips 1926
 Theilera robusta (A.DC.) Cupido 2009

References

Campanuloideae
Campanulaceae genera
Flora of South Africa
Taxa named by Edwin Percy Phillips